Elephant Butte is a summit in Hidalgo County, New Mexico.

References

Mountains of New Mexico
Landforms of Hidalgo County, New Mexico
Mountains of Hidalgo County, New Mexico